Jake Bennett may refer to:
 Jake Bennett (footballer)
 Jake Bennett (baseball)